Mairead McGuinness (born 13 June 1959) is an Irish politician serving as the European Commissioner for Financial Stability, Financial Services and the Capital Markets Union since October 2020. A member of Fine Gael, she previously served as First Vice-President of the European Parliament from 2017 to 2020. She served as a Member of the European Parliament (MEP) for East from 2004 to 2014 and for Midlands–North-West from 2014 to 2020, making her Ireland's longest serving MEP. In the European Parliament, she sat with the European People's Party (EPP).

Education and media career
McGuinness was the first female graduate of  University College Dublin's Bachelor of Science degree in Agricultural economics in 1980. In 1984, she completed a diploma in accounting and finance and followed a career in the media before entering politics in 2004. She worked as a researcher on The Late Late Show, as a presenter on RTÉ's Ear to the Ground and Celebrity Farm, a journalist with the Irish Farmers Journal and editor of the Irish Independents farming supplement.

In 2014, McGuinness was awarded UCD Alumnus of the Year for Agriculture and Food Science.

Political career

Member of the European Parliament, 2004–2020
In early 2004, McGuinness declared her intention to seek a nomination for the European Parliament election for Fine Gael. This followed speculation linking her to a similar move for the Progressive Democrats. At the selection convention in February 2004, she was selected to run alongside Avril Doyle. This proved controversial, as it was widely expected that Fine Gael could win only one of the three seats in the East constituency. However, a stronger than expected performance from Fine Gael in the election saw both women being elected.

McGuinness has been appointed to serve on several European Parliament committees, including the Committee on Agriculture and Rural Development and the delegation for relations with Australia and New Zealand] McGuinness is a substitute member of the Committee on the Environment, Public Health and Food Safety, the Committee on Petitions and the delegation for relations with China.

She was a Fine Gael candidate for the Louth constituency at the 2007 general election, but was not elected. She was re-elected on the first count at the 2009 European election, topping the poll with 25.7% of the first preference votes.

In April 2011, McGuinness announced that she wished to run for President of Ireland and would seek the Fine Gael party nomination for the 2011 presidential election. In July 2011, she was defeated for the nomination by Gay Mitchell.

At the 2014 European election, she was re-elected to the European Parliament for the new Midlands–North-West constituency.

In July 2014, McGuinness was elected Vice-President of the European Parliament; she secured an absolute majority to go through in the first round of voting by secret ballot. Under the leadership of President Martin Schulz, she oversees the parliament's information policy, press and citizens relations. In addition, she serves as chairwoman of the Working Group on Information and Communication Policy and as co-chair of the Inter-Institutional Group on Communication.

In addition to her committee assignments and duties as vice-president, McGuinness is a member of the European Parliament Intergroup on the Welfare and Conservation of Animals and the European Parliament Intergroup on Children's Rights. Alongside Karin Kadenbach, she also co-chairs the MEP Heart Group, a group of parliamentarians who have an interest in promoting measures that will help reduce the burden of cardiovascular diseases (CVD). In November 2016, One Voice For Languages welcomed McGuinness as their patron.

Also in November 2016, McGuinness officially announced her candidacy for the office of President of the European Parliament. Instead, Italian MEP and former European Commissioner Antonio Tajani was elected as the EPP group's nominee to replace incumbent president Martin Schulz; McGuinness received the second highest number of votes. Ahead of the 2019 European elections, she announced to run again for the post and was re-elected, exceeding the quota on the first count.

Following the 2019 elections, McGuiness was part of a cross-party working group in charge of drafting the European Parliament's four-year work program on digitization.

European Commissioner nomination
McGuinness was one of two people, along with Andrew McDowell, who the Irish government nominated on 4 September 2020 for one position on the European Commission to replace Phil Hogan. On 8 September 2020, McGuinness was proposed by European Commission president Ursula von der Leyen as the new Commissioner for Financial Stability, Financial Services and Capital Markets Union.

Other activities
 Friends of Europe, Member of the Board of Trustees (since 2020)

Political positions
In 2019, McGuinness proposed a plan that would privilege religious groups in consultations with the European Parliament. The proposal was shelved after a group of MEPs complained that it would create "a highly undesirable and untransparent privileged lobby channel for religious organisations".

Personal life
McGuinness is married to Tom Duff, a sheep farmer. The couple have four children.

References

External links

Mairead McGuinness' page on the VoteWatch website 

|-

1959 births
Alumni of University College Dublin
Articles containing video clips
21st-century women MEPs for the Republic of Ireland
Fine Gael MEPs
Irish Independent people
Irish women journalists
Living people
MEPs for the Republic of Ireland 2004–2009
MEPs for the Republic of Ireland 2009–2014
MEPs for the Republic of Ireland 2014–2019
MEPs for the Republic of Ireland 2019–2024
Politicians from County Louth
RTÉ television presenters
The Late Late Show (Irish talk show)
Irish European Commissioners
European Commissioners 2019–2024